The Very Best of Vince Guaraldi is the sixth compilation album of songs by American jazz pianist/composer Vince Guaraldi released on August 7, 2012, in the U.S by Fantasy/Concord Records as part of their "Very Best" series.

Background
The Very Best of Vince Guaraldi was an attempt by Fantasy/Concord Records to release what AllMusic critic Al Campbell deemed a "decent budget-line" version of the more expansive, 31-track compilation The Definitive Vince Guaraldi from 2009.

Track listing

References

2012 compilation albums
Fantasy Records compilation albums
Concord Records compilation albums
Albums produced by Vince Guaraldi
Vince Guaraldi albums
Vince Guaraldi compilation albums
Albums arranged by Vince Guaraldi
Cool jazz compilation albums
Mainstream jazz compilation albums